Kosmos 238 ( meaning Cosmos 238) was the final test series of the Soviet Soyuz spacecraft prior to the launch of Soyuz 2. It tested the orbital maneuvering system, reentry, descent and landing systems that had been modified and improved after the Soyuz 1 accident.

Mission parameters
Spacecraft: Soyuz 7K-OK 
Mass: 6520 kg
 Crew: None
 Launched: 28 August 1968, 10:04:00 GMT
 Landed: 1 September 1968, 09:03:00 GMT
Perigee: 194 km
Apogee: 313 km
Inclination: 51.7°
Period: 88.5 minutes
 NSSDC ID: 1968-072A

References
Text comes from NASA NSSDC Master Catalog

Soyuz uncrewed test flights
Kosmos satellites
1968 in the Soviet Union
Spacecraft launched in 1968